Hannah Cohen (born October 25, 1986) is an American singer and model. She has released three albums and toured internationally.

Family background
Hannah Cohen was born in San Francisco and comes from a family of musicians and booksellers. Her grandfather, Bertie Rodgers, was a poet. Her father is the Jazz drummer Myron Cohen.

Hannah left home as a teenager, soon finding herself in New York and becoming something of a muse to the city's art scene, posing for Richard Prince, Terry Richardson, David Salle, Will Cotton,  and Ryan McGinley.

Hannah immersed herself in New York's music scene, working at the Village Vanguard.

Music career

Child Bride
Hannah's debut record, Child Bride, was produced by Thomas Bartlett, aka Doveman, known for his keyboard work with artists like The National and Antony and the Johnsons. Drawn from Hannah and Thomas's mutual friends, the core band is a small group of New York musicians, including Sam Amidon, Rob Moose, Brad Albetta, Doug Wieselman and Kenny Wollesen. Their sessions were recorded by engineer Patrick Dillett. Child Bride was released by Bella Union on April 23, 2012.

Pleasure Boy
A second album, Pleasure Boy was released March 2015.

Welcome Home
A third album, Welcome Home was released April 2019.

References

External links
 Bella Union: Hannah Cohen

1986 births
Living people
Jewish American musicians
American women singer-songwriters
Singers from San Francisco
Songwriters from San Francisco
21st-century American singers
21st-century American women singers
Bella Union artists
21st-century American Jews
Singer-songwriters from California